The 1970 All-Ireland Senior Club Camogie Championship for the leading clubs in the women's team field sport of camogie was won for the third year in succession by St Paul’s from Kilkenny, who defeated Bellaghy from Derry in the final, played at Bellaghy .

Arrangements
The championship was organised on the traditional provincial system used in Gaelic Games since the 1880s, with South Pres and Breaffy winning the championships of the other two provinces.

The Final
Helena O'Neill scored three goals in St Paul’s victory over Bellaghy who had seven Derry county players on their team together with Teresa Cassidy, the former Antrim All-Ireland goalkeeper. Agnes Hourigan wrote in the Irish Press: After an uncertain start they gave a magnificent display of camogie before what was, very fittingly, the biggest crowd ever mustered for one of these club championship finals.

Provincial stages

Final stages

References

External links
 Camogie Association

1970 in camogie
1970
Cam